The Renfe Class 250 is a class of electric locomotives operated by Renfe in Spain, built by Krauss Maffei and CAF.

Variants
The fleet consists of 35 Class 250 locomotives, numbered 250 001–035, and five Class 250.6 locomotives, numbered 250 601–605, which are equipped with chopper control.

Technical specifications
The locomotives have a C-C wheel arrangement, and are equipped with monomotor bogies, which have switchable gear ratios. Their maximum axle load is 22 tonnes.

History
The locomotives were introduced in 1982. A total of 40 locomotives have been built. They are mainly used on freight services by Renfe's Cargas freight and Transporte Combinado intermodal divisions.

References

Footnotes

Further reading

External links

250
Electric locomotives of Spain
Railway locomotives introduced in 1982